The American dusky flycatcher (Empidonax oberholseri), or simply dusky flycatcher, is a small insectivorous passerine of the tyrant flycatcher family.

The dusky flycatcher is one of many species in the genus Empidonax. These species are very similar in appearance and behavior, and they are notoriously difficult to differentiate. The best characteristics for distinguishing these species are voice, breeding habitat, and range.

Description
Adults have olive-gray upperparts, darker on the wings and tail, with whitish underparts; they have a noticeable medium-width white eye ring, white wing bars and a medium length tail. The breast is washed with olive-gray. The bill is mainly dark. It is a bit smaller than the American grey flycatcher and a bit larger than the Hammond's flycatcher.

Vocalizations
The male sings a three-part song. A common call is a dry whit, similar to that of other Empidonax flycatchers. A less common call that is possibly only given by male is a sad dew-hic.

Taxonomy
The scientific name commemorates the American ornithologist Harry Church Oberholser.

Distribution
These birds migrate to southern Arizona and Mexico. As non-breeding residents in the south of their migration range, they are passage migrants over the deserts of the south-western United States, the Mojave, Sonoran, and Chihuahuan Deserts, where they make their stops along the flyway.

Habitat
Their breeding habitat is mountain slopes and foothills with brush and scattered trees (especially ponderosa pine) across western North America. They make a cup nest low in a vertical fork in a shrub.

Behavior
They wait on an open perch and fly out to catch insects in flight, (hawking), also sometimes picking insects from foliage while hovering, (gleaning).

References

External links 

  Empidonax oberholseri
 Pictures
Photo gallery VIREO (close-up)

American dusky flycatcher
Native birds of Western Canada
Native birds of the Western United States
American dusky flycatcher
American dusky flycatcher